Kajari is a folk song and dance genre of India. It is a Hindustani classical music genre, performed during the rainy season usually late June to September when lush greenery reappears and agricultural labor begins again.

It is often used to describe the longing of a maiden for her lover as the black monsoon cloud comes hanging in the summer skies, and the style is notably sung during the rainy season.

Kajri derives from the word kajra or kohl, and is sung in the Awadhi and Bhojpuri regions.

References

Indian styles of music
Hindustani music genres
Folk dances of Bihar
Uttar Pradesh folklore
Culture of Bihar
Hindustani music terminology